Karim Fradin (born 2 February 1972) is a French football executive and former player who played as a midfielder. As of 2021, he is the president of Ligue 2 club Niort.

After football
After he retired from playing football, Fradin began a career in sports management, becoming the president of former club Niort in 2009.

References

External links
Karim Fradin profile at chamoisfc79.fr 

1972 births
Living people
Association football midfielders
French footballers
Valenciennes FC players
OGC Nice players
Stockport County F.C. players
LB Châteauroux players
Chamois Niortais F.C. players
French football chairmen and investors